Preeti Sagar is a former Bollywood playback singer who won the Filmfare Award for Best Female Playback Singer for the song "Mero Gaam Katha Parey" from Manthan in 1978 and for the hit song "My Heart is Beating" from Julie (1975).

Career
Preeti is an accomplished singer with basic classical knowledge in music and singing. She shot to instant fame with her English song My Heart is Beating in Julie. She won a special Filmfare award for the same.

She is also well known for her contribution in the children's entertainment and education industry. She worked with Sa Re Ga Ma to create audio versions of several children's nursery rhyme collections in Hindi and English. She also created a Fairy Tales series.

She now runs her own production company called Angela Films which does advertising, short films and feature-film dubbing. In the 1990s, Angela Films produced the hit children's TV show, Phulwari Bachchon Ki. She was part of jury of the 52nd National Film Awards.

In 2010, she sang the UIDAI ID project's official theme song, Yeh Hai Meri Pehchaan.

Personal life
Preeti Sagar lives in Mumbai with her husband and two daughters. Her father, actor Moti Sagar, cousin of actor Motilal and singer Mukesh, appeared in films like Apna Ghar, Burma Road, and Chhoti Chhoti Baatein in 1950s and '60s. Preeti has two sisters Neeti, who wrote the song "Mero Gaam Katha Pare" and Namita Sagar, who anchored Phulwari Bachchon Ki (1992–1999), produced by her father.

Popular Tracks
 Julie (1975) – My heart is beating
 Nishant (1975) – Piya Baaj Pyaala Piya Jaaye Na
 Manthan (1976) – Mero Gaam Kathyawade
 Bhoomika (1977) – Tumhaare Bin Jee Naa Laage
 Kalyug (1981) – What's your problem
 Mandi (1983) – Shamsher Barahna Maang Ghazab
 Locket (1986) – Jo Bhi Kehna Sach Hain Kehna

References

External links

 Preeti Sagar at last.fm
 Angela Films Company official website

Bollywood playback singers
Filmfare Awards winners
Indian women playback singers
Living people
Year of birth missing (living people)
20th-century Indian singers
20th-century Indian women singers
Indian women pop singers
Indian women classical singers
21st-century Indian singers
21st-century Indian women singers